The Virginie class was a class of ten 40-gun frigates of the French Navy, designed in 1793 by Jacques-Noël Sané. An eleventh vessel (Zephyr) begun in 1794 was never completed.

 Virginie
Builder: Brest
Begun: November 1793
Launched: 26 July 1794
Completed: December 1794
Fate: Captured by the British Navy on 22 April 1796, becoming HMS Virginie.

 Courageuse
Builder: Brest
Begun: December 1793
Launched: early August 1794
Completed: December 1794
Fate: Renamed Justice April 1795. Captured by the British Navy in September 1801, but not added to Royal Navy; instead, handed over to the Turkish Navy.

 Harmonie
Builder: Bordeaux
Begun: May 1794
Launched: early 1796
Completed: May 1796
Fate: Beached and burnt to avoid capture by the British Navy in April 1797.

 Volontaire
Builder: Bordeaux
Begun: September 1794
Launched: 7 June 1796
Completed: 1796
Fate: Captured by the British Navy on 4 March 1806, becoming HMS Volontaire.

 Cornélie
Builder: Brest
Begun: March 1794
Launched: 19 September 1796
Completed: April 1798
Fate: Captured by the Spanish Navy in June 1808, becoming Spanish Cornelia.

 Zéphyr
Builder: Brest
Begun: March 1794
Fate: Construction abandoned in April 1804 (never launched).

 Didon
Builder: Saint Malo
Begun: September 1796
Launched: 1 August 1799
Completed: September 1800
Fate: Captured by the British Navy on 10 August 1805, becoming HMS Didon.

 Atalante
Builder: Saint Malo
Begun: September 1799
Launched: 29 June 1802
Completed: July 1802
Fate: Wrecked in November 1805.

 Rhin
Builder: Toulon
Begun: June 1801
Launched: 15 April 1802
Completed: October 1802
Fate: Captured by the British Navy on 27 July 1806, becoming HMS Rhin.

 Belle Poule
Builder: Basse-Indre
Begun: June 1801
Launched: 17 April 1802
Completed: September 1802
Fate: Captured by the British Navy on 13 March 1806, becoming HMS Belle Poule.

 Surveillante
Builder: Basse-Indre
Begun: July 1801
Launched: 29 May 1802
Completed: December 1802
Fate: Captured by the British Navy on 30 November 1803, becoming HMS Surveillante.

References 
Rif Winfield, British Warships in the Age of Sail, 1793-1817, Seaforth Publishing, 2007, .
 

Virginie
 
Ship classes of the French Navy